Mexican-Moroccan relations are the diplomatic relations between the United Mexican States and the Kingdom of Morocco. Both nations are members of the Group of 24 and the United Nations.

History 

In April 1956, Morocco obtained its independence from France. In 1961, Mexican President Adolfo López Mateos sent a presidential delegation led by Special Envoy Alejandro Carrillo Marcor and Delegate José Ezequiel Iturriaga, to visit Morocco and work toward the establishment of diplomatic relations. On October 31, 1962, Mexico and Morocco formally established diplomatic relations.

Relations between the two nations in the beginning remained cordial without any major bilateral agreements taking place; however, relations became strained after Mexico recognized the right to self-determination and established diplomatic relations with the government of Western Sahara in 1979. In 1990, Mexico established an embassy in Rabat which had originally been accredited from its embassy in Lisbon. In 1991, Morocco reciprocated the gesture by opening an embassy in Mexico City where it had originally been accredited from Washington, D.C.

In March 2002, Moroccan Prime Minister Abderrahmane Youssoufi attended the Monterrey Consensus in the northern Mexican city of Monterrey. In October 2003, King Mohammed VI of Morocco made an official visit to Mexico. In November 2004, King Mohammed VI paid a second visit to Mexico and in February 2005, Mexican President Vicente Fox made an official visit to Morocco. In January 2009, Moroccan Foreign Minister Taieb Fassi Fihri visited Mexico. Later, in December of the same year, Mexican Foreign Minister, Patricia Espinosa Cantellano visited Morocco.

In 2012, both nations celebrated 50 years of diplomatic relations. In 2016, an inter-institutional cooperation agreement was signed between Mexico's Centro de Enseñanza Técnica y Superior and Morocco's Al Akhawayn University for the exchange of teachers and students between both universities. In December 2018, Mexican Foreign Minister Marcelo Ebrard visited Morocco to attend the Intergovernmental Conference on the Global Compact for Migration in Marrakesh.

High-level visits
High-level visits from Mexico to Morocco
 Special Envoy Alejandro Carrillo Marcor (1961)
 Delegate José Ezequiel Iturriaga (1961)
 President Vicente Fox (2005)
 Foreign Minister Patricia Espinosa Cantellano (2009)
 Director General for Africa and the Middle East Jorge Álvarez Fuentes (2018)
 Foreign Minister Marcelo Ebrard (2018)

High-level visits from Morocco to Mexico
 Prime Minister Abderrahmane Youssoufi (2002)
 King Mohammed VI (2003, 2004)
 Foreign Minister Mohamed Benaissa (2007)
 Foreign Minister Taieb Fassi Fihri (2009)

Bilateral agreements 
Both nations have signed several bilateral agreements such as an Agreement on Business Cooperation (1991); Agreement on Educational and Cultural Cooperation (2004); Memorandum of Understanding for the Establishment of a Mechanism of Consultation in Matters of Mutual Interest (2004); Agreement of Diplomatic and Academic Cooperation (2005); Agreement on Hydraulic Resource Cooperation (2005) and an Agreement to Promote Cooperation in the Modernization of Public Administration, Open Government, Transparency and to Combat Corruption (2008).

Trade 
In 2018, two-way trade between both nations amounted to US$508 million. Mexico's main exports to Morocco include: sugar, tobacco, alcohol (beer), building materials and airplane parts. Morocco's main exports to Mexico include: electrical circuits, textiles and cotton. Mexican multinational companies such as Cemex, Gruma and Grupo Bimbo; operate in Morocco.

Resident diplomatic missions 
 Mexico has an embassy in Rabat.
 Morocco has an embassy in Mexico City.

References 

 
Morocco
Bilateral relations of Morocco